Hamaijan District is a district (bakhsh) in Sepidan County, Fars Province, Iran. At the 2006 census, its population was 27,048, in 6,199 families.  The District has one city: Hamashahr. The District has three rural districts (dehestan): Hamaijan Rural District, Shesh Pir Rural District, and Sornabad Rural District.

References 

Sepidan County
Districts of Fars Province